The first European Parliament election by direct universal suffrage, took place in June 1979.

In 1981, the accession of Greece meant the addition of new members from the country, initially sending delegates.

MEPs by country 
MEPs for Belgium 1979–1984
MEPs for Denmark 1979–1984
MEPs for France 1979–1984
MEPs for Greece 1981–1984
MEPs for Greece 1981 (delegation)
MEPs for Germany 1979–1984
MEPs for Ireland 1979–1984
MEPs for Italy 1979–1984
MEPs for Luxembourg 1979–1984
List of members of the European Parliament for the Netherlands, 1979–1984
MEPs for the UK 1979–1984

A 
Victor Abens
Gordon Adam
Dimitrios Adamou
Pietro Adonnino
Susanna Agnelli
Heinrich Aigner
Alekos Alavanos
Siegbert Alber
Willem Albers
Georgios Alexiadis
Nicolas Alfonsi
Giorgio Almirante
Giorgio Amendola
Magdeleine Anglade
Gustave Ansart
Vincent Ansquer
Dario Antoniozzi
Gaetano Arfé
Rudi Arndt

B 
Fabrizia Baduel Glorioso
Louis Baillot
Richard Balfe
Neil Balfour
Martin Bangemann
Giovanni Barbagli
Carla Barbarella
Paolo Barbi
Robert Battersby
Pierre Baudin
Peter Beazley
Cornelis Berkhouwer
Enrico Berlinguer
Pierre Bernard
Giovanni Bersani
Nicholas Bethell
Enzo Bettiza
Bouke Beumer
Luc Beyer de Ryke
Philipp von Bismarck
Neil Blaney
Erik Blumenfeld
Reinhold Bocklet
Fernand Boden
Jørgen Bøgh
Alain Bombard
Aldo Bonaccini
Jens-Peter Bonde
Emma Bonino
Elise Boot
André Bord
Bodil Boserup
Leonidas Bournias
Roland Boyes
Willy Brandt
Elmar Brok
Beata Brookes
Dominique Bucchini
Janey Buchan
Hubert Jean Buchou
Antonino Buttafuoco

C 
Richard Caborn
Henri Caillavet
Corentin Calvez
Mario Capanna
Umberto Cardia
Tullia Carettoni Romagnoli
Antonio Cariglia
Angelo Carossino
Maria Luisa Cassanmagnago Cerretti
Luciana Castellina
Barbara Castle
Fred Catherwood
Manlio Cecovini
Domenico Ceravolo
Robert Chambeiron
Raphaël Chanterie
Ioannis Charalambopoulos
Gisèle Charzat
Jacques Chirac
Nicole Chouraqui
Maria Lisa Cinciari Rodano
Gaetano Cingari
Jean-José Clement
Mark Clinton
Frank Cluskey
Ann Clwyd
Robert Cohen
Marcel Colla
Arnaldo Colleselli
Ken Collins
Francisque Collomb
Emilio Colombo
Francis Combe
Maurits Coppieters
Francesco Cosentino
Roberto Costanzo
Richard Cottrell
Pierre-Bernard Cousté
Yannis Coutsocheras
Bettino Craxi
Édith Cresson
Jerry Cronin
Lambert Croux
David Curry

D 
Giorgos Dalakouras
Joachim Dalsass
Ian Dalziel
Shelagh Roberts
Félix Damette
André Damseaux
Francescopaolo D'Angelosante
Pieter Dankert
Michael Davern
Willy De Clercq
Basil de Ferranti
Aar de Goede
Karel De Gucht
Paul De Keersmaeker
Christian de La Malène
Jean de Lipkowski
Danielle de March-Ronco
Pancrazio De Pasquale
Síle de Valera
Michel Debatisse
Michel Debré
Suzanne Dekker
Antonio del Duca
Charles Delatte
Gustave Deleau
Fernand Delmotte
Robert Delorozoy
Jacques Delors
Xavier Deniau
Jacques Denis
Pierre Descamps
Eileen Desmond
Marie-Jacqueline Desouches
Mario Di Bartolomei
Alfredo Diana
Mario Dido'
Marie-Madeleine Dienesch
André Diligent
Ioannis Dimopoulos
Georges Donnez
Olivier d'Ormesson
Maurice Doublet
Maurice Druon
Paule Duport
Raymonde Dury

E 
Doeke Eisma
Vasilis Efraimidis
Diana Elles
Derek Enright
Sergio Ercini
Nicolas Estgen
Claude Estier
Winnie Ewing
Louis Eyraud

F 
Roger Fajardie
Guido Fanti
André Fanton
Edgar Faure
Maurice Faure
Ludwig Fellermaier
Adam Fergusson
Guy Fernandez
Bruno Ferrero
Mauro Ferri
Ove Fich
Eligio Filippi
Marc Fischbach
Seán Flanagan
Colette Flesch
Katharina Focke
Raymond Forni
Norvela Forster
Eric Forth
Assimakis Fotilas
Marie-Madeleine Fourcade
Dimitrios Frangos
Otmar Franz
Bruno Friedrich
Ingo Friedrich
Georges Louis Frischmann
Isidor Früh
Gérard Fuchs
Karl Fuchs
Yvette Fuillet

G 
Volkmar Gabert
Paola Gaiotti
Michael Gallagher
Yves Galland
Carlo Alberto Galluzzi
Françoise Gaspard
Vincenzo Gatto
Roger Gauthier
Fritz Gautier
Jas Gawronski
Paul-Henry Gendebien
Antonios Georgiadis
Achillefs Gerokostopoulos
François-Marie Geronimi
Aart Geurtsen
Alberto Ghergo
Giovanni Giavazzi
Alain Gillot
Vincenzo Giummarra
Ernest Glinne
Ilias Glykofridis
Charles Goerens
Guido Gonella
Konstantinos Gontikas
Alfons Goppel
Anselmo Gouthier
Eva Gredal
François Gremetz
Jim Griffiths
Mette Groes

H 

Brendan Halligan
Jean Hamilius
Else Hammerich
Klaus Hänsch
David Harris
Kai-Uwe von Hassel
Karl Hauenschild

Wilhelm Helms

Magdalene Hoff

Gloria Hooper
William Hopper
Brian Hord
John Horgan
Paul Howell
John Hume
Alasdair Hutton

I 
Nilde Iotti
Felice Ippolito

J 
Christopher Jackson
Robert Jackson

Frédéric Jalton
Jim Janssen van Raaij
Gérard Jaquet
Stanley Johnson
Sjouke Jonker

K 
Konstantinos Kallias

Kostas Kappos

Yannis Katsafados

Liam Kavanagh

Justin Keating
Edward Kellett-Bowman
Elaine Kellett-Bowman
Brian Key

Egon Klepsch

Dimitrios Koulourianos

Heinz Kühn

L 

Joseph Lalor

Jean Lecanuet
Silvio Lega

Marcelle Lentz-Cornette
Marlene Lenz
Silvio Leonardi
Leonidas Kyrkos

Giosuè Ligios
Salvatore Lima

John Ling

Anne-Marie Lizin
Eugen Loderer
Alf Lomas
Charles-Émile Loo

Finn Lynge

M 

Maria Antonietta Macciocchi

T. J. Maher
Hanja Maij-Weggen
Ernst Majonica
Kurt Malangré
Georges Marchais

Christos Markopoulos

John Marshall (Conservative politician)

Simone Martin

Pierre Mauroy
Sylvie Mayer
Joe McCartin
Thomas Megahy

Pierre Messmer

Karl-Heinrich Mihr
Marcello Modiano
Poul Møller

James Moorhouse
Jacques Moreau

Robert Moreland
Didier Motchane
Jean Mouchel
Ernst Müller-Hermann

N 
Angelo Narducci
Jacqueline Nebout
Bill Newton Dunn
Harmar Nicholls
David Nicolson
Brøndlund Nielsen
Tove Nielsen
Kalliopi Nikolaou
Konstantinos Nikolaou
Hans Nord
Franz-Josef Nordlohne
Jean-Thomas Nordmann
Tom Normanton
Harrij Notenboom
Charles-Ferdinand Nothomb
Kai Nyborg

O 
John O'Connell
Tom O'Donnell
Jean Oehler
Charles O'Hagan
O'LEARY Michael
OLESEN Kjeld
Flor O'Mahony
Flavio Orlandi
Aristidis Ouzounidis

P 
Ian Paisley
Giancarlo Pajetta
Marco Pannella

Yiannos Papantoniou

Ben Patterson
Séamus Pattison

Andrew Pearce
Mario Pedini
Jiří Pelikán

Anastasios Peponis
Daniel Percheron
Nicole Péry

Eggert Petersen
Francesco Petronio
Gero Pfennig
Pierre Pflimlin

Flaminio Piccoli
Sergio Pininfarina
Jean-François Pintat
René-Émile Piquet
Edgard Pisani

Henry Plumb

Christian Poncelet
Michel Poniatowski

Hans-Gert Pöttering
Derek Prag

Peter Price

Christopher Prout
James Provan

Albert Pürtsen
John Purvis

Q 
Joyce Quin

R 
Renate-Charlotte Rabbethge
Lucien Radoux
Eugène Remilly
Jean Rey
Brandon Rhys-Williams
Martin Rieger
Günter Rinsche
Carlo Ripa di Meana
Hector Rivierez
Dieter Rogalla
Allan Rogers
Hector Rolland
Pino Romualdi
André Rossi
Yvette Roudy
Giorgio Ruffolo
Mariano Rumor
Richie Ryan

S 
Victor Sablé
Henri Saby
Heinke Salisch
Bernhard Sälzer
Jacques Santer
Georges Sarre
Mario Sassano
Casimir Johannes Prinz zu Sayn-Wittgenstein-Berleburg
Marie-Claire Scamaroni
Wolfgang Schall
Rudolf Schieler
Dieter Schinzel
Ursula Schleicher
Gerhard Schmid
Heinz Schmitt
Paul Schnitker
Karl Schön
Konrad Schön
Roger-Gérard Schwartzenberg
Olaf Schwencke
Leonardo Sciascia
James Scott-Hopkins
Christiane Scrivener
Barry Seal
Horst Seefeld
Hans-Joachim Seeler
Sergio Camillo Segre
Lieselotte Seibel-Emmerling
Jean Seitlinger
Richard Seligman
Alexander Sherlock
Hellmut Sieglerschmidt
Richard Simmonds
Maurice-René Simonnet
Anthony Simpson
Jack Stewart-Clark
Sven Skovmand
Evanghelos Soussouroyannis
Antoinette Spaak
Jean Spautz
Tom Spencer
James Spicer
Altiero Spinelli
Vera Squarcialupi
Carlo Stella
Giorgio Strehler
Georges Sutra

T 

John Taylor (Northern Ireland)
John Taylor (Midlands East)

Gaston Thorn
Leo Tindemans
Teun Tolman

Seán Treacy
Frederick Tuckman
André Turcat
Amédée Turner
Alan Tyrrell

V 
Jochen van Aerssen
Ien van den Heuvel

Karel Van Miert
Johan van Minnen
Eric Van Rompuy

Herman Vanderpoorten

Peter Vanneck

Marie-Claude Vayssade
Simone Veil

Paul Vergès

Jan Verroken
Heinz Oskar Vetter

Phili Viehoff
Bruno Visentini

Thomas von der Vring
Otto von Habsburg
Karl von Wogau
Anne Vondeling

W 
Manfred Wagner
Gerd Walter
Hanna Walz
Frederick Warner
Kurt Wawrzik
Beate Weber
Rudolf Wedekind
Louise Weiss
Charles Wellesley
Michael Welsh
Klaus Wettig
Heidemarie Wieczorek-Zeul

Jean Wolter

Francis Wurtz

Z 
Benigno Zaccagnini
Mario Zagari

Ortensio Zecchino

See also
 Member of the European Parliament
 1979 European Parliament election